The Montreal Tapes: Liberation Music Orchestra is a live album by the American jazz bassist Charlie Haden's Liberation Music Orchestra recorded in 1989 at the Montreal International Jazz Festival and released on the Verve label.

Reception 
The Allmusic review by Don Snowden awarded the album 4 stars, stating, "Can't say this is the pick of the group's discs or even of Haden's The Montreal Tapes series, but the musicians play up to the occasion (Geri Allen, in particular, shines) and man, that version of "We Shall Overcome..."".

Track listing
All compositions by Charlie Haden except as indicated
 "La Pasionaria" - 24:00 
 "Silence" - 6:24 
 "Sandino" - 8:37 
 "We Shall Overcome" (Guy Carawan, Frank Hamilton, Zilphia Horton, Pete Seeger) - 37:20 
Recorded at the Festival de Jazz de Montreal in Canada on July 8, 1989

Personnel
Charlie Haden – bass
Ken McIntyre - alto saxophone 
Ernie Watts, Joe Lovano - tenor saxophone 
Stanton Davis, Tom Harrell - trumpet 
Ray Anderson - trombone
Sharon Freeman - French horn
Joe Daley - tuba
Mick Goodrick - guitar  
Geri Allen - piano
Paul Motian - drums

References 

Verve Records live albums
Liberation Music Orchestra albums
1997 live albums